Bein (German for leg) is a German and Yiddish surname and may refer to:

People
 Alex Bein, Jewish scholar
 Kazimierz Bein, Polish ophthalmologist, the founder and sometime director of the Warsaw Ophthalmic Institute
 Uwe Bein, German footballer

Others
 beIN Media Group
 beIN Network, a Pay TV Network
 beIN Sports, a satellite TV channels

See also
 Bain